The Constitutional Sheriffs and Peace Officers Association (CSPOA) is a political organization of local police officials in the United States who contend that federal and state government authorities are subordinate to the local authority of county sheriffs. Self-described constitutional sheriffs assert that they are the supreme legal authority with the power and duty to defy or disregard laws they regard as unconstitutional. As a result, they may sometimes be referred to as sovereign sheriffs. The movement is related to previous nullification and interposition notions, and promotes such efforts.  It has been described as far-right by the Southern Poverty Law Center. The CSPOA has claimed a membership of 400.

History

The association was founded in 2011 by former Arizona sheriff Richard Mack who was a board member of the Oath Keepers at the time. In 2017, the association said it had 4,500 dues-paying members, with more than 200 sheriffs among them. In 2021, Mack said that 300 of the 3,000 sheriffs in the U.S. were members of the association.

Ideology

The movement has some ideological similarities with the self-styled patriot movement and sovereign citizen movement, and some members of those movements also espouse "constitutional sheriff" ideology. The "constitutional sheriff" or "county supremacy" movement itself arose from the far-right Posse Comitatus, a racist and anti-Semitic group of the 1970s and 1980s that also defined the county sheriff as the highest "legitimate" authority in the country, and was characterized by paramilitary figures and the promotion of conspiracy theories. Sheriffs are not mentioned in the U.S. Constitution. The ideological basis of the sheriffs' movement is instead based on various incorrect historical and legal claims, relying on a pretense that the historic powers of the high sheriff of an English shire apply in the USA regardless of subsequent legal developments.

A number of county sheriffs in the United States have expressed sympathy with the movement's goals and have publicly vowed not to enforce laws they deem unconstitutional. Law professor Robert L. Tsai writes that, "in practice constitutional sheriffs and their followers tend to occupy the edges of anti-government conservatism, organizing themselves to promote gun rights and property rights, to resist tax laws, national healthcare, gay marriage." Members of the movement have vowed not to enforce gun laws, public health measures adopted to combat the 2020 COVID-19 pandemic, and federal land use regulations. Sheriffs who refuse to enforce land-use laws facilitate the illegal use of public land (for example, for livestock grazing or all-terrain vehicles use) and in some cases have threatened Bureau of Land Management (BLM) employees. A research study of reports from 1995 to 2015 found that counties with sheriffs who are members of the movement "have higher rates of violence against BLM employees than other Western counties."

The movement has attracted support from some landowners, county commissioners, law enforcement figures (in particular Richard Mack and Joe Arpaio), and some politicians who have played on "fears of federal officials intruding on property rights and gun rights."

References

External links
 Constitutional Sheriffs and Peace Officers Association
 "The Renegade Sheriffs

Political organizations based in the United States
Patriot movement
Right-wing militia organizations in the United States
Bundy standoff
+